Bernhard Theodor Henry Minetti (26 January 1905 – 12 October 1998) was a German actor. He appeared in 50 films between 1931 and 1996 but is mostly known for his distinguished stage career.

Selected filmography
The Murderer Dimitri Karamazov (1930) as Ivan Karamazov
Berlin-Alexanderplatz (1931) as Reinhold
Joan of Arc (1935) as a bailiff
 My Life for Maria Isabella (1935) as Von Hackenberg
 Der Kaiser von Kalifornien (1936) as the stranger
 Alarm in Peking (1937) as Tu-Hang
 By a Silken Thread (1938) as Dr. Heinrich Breuer
 Secret Code LB 17 (1938) as Club Manager Bjelinski
 Woman Without a Past (1939) as Igor Costa
 Robert Koch (1939) as Göhrte the exorcist
Friedrich Schiller – The Triumph of a Genius (1940) as Franz Moor
 The Eternal Spring (1940) as Wolfgang Lusinger
The Rothschilds (1940) as Fouché
 Tiefland (1954) as Don Sebastian, Marquis de Roccabruna
 It (1966) as Customer
The Left-Handed Woman (1978) as The publisher

References

External links

1905 births
1998 deaths
Actors from Kiel
People from the Province of Schleswig-Holstein
German male film actors
20th-century German male actors
Commanders Crosses of the Order of Merit of the Federal Republic of Germany